Sathyam Babu Dixithulu (born 31 July 1951), known by his stage name Sarath Babu, is an Indian actor known for his works predominantly in Tamil and Telugu cinema. He has worked in more than 200 films. He has appeared in Telugu, Tamil, Kannada and a few in Malayalam and Hindi. He entered the film industry in 1973 through a Telugu film and later became popular through the Tamil film Nizhal Nijamagiradhu (1978), directed by K. Balachander. He has received eight state Nandi Awards.

Early life 
Sarath Babu was born as Sathyam Babu Dixithulu on 31 July 1951.

Career
He is reported to have said that

Selected filmography
This is partial filmography of Sarath Babu.

Dubbing artist

Television

Awards
Nandi Awards
Best Supporting Actor - Seethakoka Chilaka (1981)
Best Supporting Actor - O Bharya Katha (1988)
Best Supporting Actor - Neerajanam (1989)

Other Awards
Tamil Nadu State Film Award for Best Character Artiste (Male) for the film Malayan in 2017.

References

External links
 

Indian male film actors
Living people
Male actors in Tamil cinema
Male actors in Kannada cinema
Male actors in Telugu cinema
Nandi Award winners
Male actors from Andhra Pradesh
1951 births
People from Srikakulam district
20th-century Indian male actors
21st-century Indian male actors
Tamil Nadu State Film Awards winners
People from Uttarandhra